The 1910 Brussels Tournament was an international ice hockey tournament held in Brussels, Belgium from December 29–31, 1910. Four teams participated in the tournament, which was won by the Oxford Canadians.

Results

Final Table

See also
1911 Brussels Ice Hockey Tournament

External links
 Tournament on hockeyarchives.info

Brussels Ice Hockey Tournament
Brussels
Brussels